Sarah Delahunty  (born 1952) is a New Zealand writer and director who was born in Wellington. An award-winning playwright, Delahunty has written over 30 plays, often focussing on works for youth.

In the 2015 Queen's Birthday Honours, Delahunty was appointed a Member of the New Zealand Order of Merit, for services to theatre.

Life 
Delahunty was born in Wellington, and grew up there with her sister, politician Catherine Delahunty. Sarah enrolled at the New Zealand Drama School but found it boring and left after ten days. She then worked at Downstage Theatre, before getting a lead role on soap opera Close to Home.

Awards
 Best Theatre, NZ Fringe Festival Affinity 
 2012 Playmarket's Plays for the Young Competition The Beanstalkers 
 2009 Playmarket's Plays for Young Competition 2b or not 2b 
 2008 Pick of the Fringe 2b or not 2b 
 1987 Bruce Mason Playwriting Award

Publications 
Two Plays Sarah Delahunty (Playmarket, 2009); 2b or nt 2b and Eating the Wolf.

Plays 
 2020 - #UsTwo: Six Decades of Sisterhood
 2019 - This Long Winter
 2018 - Question Time Blues with Catherine Delahunty
 2015 – Where She Stood, nominated for 2016 Fringe Festival Residency Award 
 2014 – 4 billion likes  
 2013 – Affinity  
 2011 – Falling Sparrows Here or There  
 2011 – Crazy Joint Love  
 2010 – Song of Four  
 2010 – Trusting Strangers, Counting Stars
 2010 – Inside Out 
 2010 – Medea Songs
 2008 – The Antigone Project
 2008 – 2b or nt 2b 
 2007 – Another Planet 
 2007 – Homework 
 2006 – Superbeast 
 2005 – Eating the Wolf 
 2002 – Driving You Crazy 
 2002 – The Oddity 
 2002 – Lifelines (music by Michelle Scullion) 
 Time On Our Side
 2000 – Damage 
 Blind Date 
 Dear Felicity 
 1998 – The Last Gasp Café 
 1996 – Second Sight 
 1992 – Gifts 
 Greener Grass 
 1986 – Loose Connections 
 1985 – Stretchmarks

Plays for children 
 The Beanstalkers
 Friends Forever
 Sleeping Beauty
 Magic in the Air
 The Emperor's New Clothes
 Beauty and the Beast
 Puss in Boots
 The Adventures of Toad (adaptation)
 Harry Under the Bed
 The Frog Prince
 The Tinderbox
 Jack and the Beanstalk
 Rumpelstiltskin
 The Gingerbread Man
 Snow White and Rose Red
 The BFG (adaptation)
 The Twits (adaptation)

References

1952 births
Living people
New Zealand women dramatists and playwrights
New Zealand theatre directors
Members of the New Zealand Order of Merit
20th-century New Zealand dramatists and playwrights
20th-century New Zealand women writers
21st-century New Zealand dramatists and playwrights
21st-century New Zealand women writers